The Beautiful Letdown is the fourth studio album by alternative rock band Switchfoot. Released on February 25, 2003, it launched the band into the mainstream on the strength of two top 20 singles: "Meant to Live" and "Dare You to Move." The album was hugely popular and remained a staple on the Billboard 200 album chart for a considerable amount of time. The album sold over 2.7 million copies in the US and was eventually certified double platinum by the RIAA.

The album won an Album of the Year award at the 2003 San Diego Music Awards. It was ranked No. 195 on Billboards 200 Albums of the Decade.

 Production 
 Recording and history 
In 2002, the band entered the studio to begin recording the follow-up to their 2000 record, Learning to Breathe. They were unsigned at the time, their contract with re:think Records/Sparrow having expired with the completion of Learning to Breathe. Bassist Tim Foreman has said: "This was the most freedom we had ever felt while tracking an album — no record labels, no distractions, just four guys making the record we'd always wanted to make." They finished recording in two weeks, but shortly afterwards were signed to the major record label Columbia Records/Red Ink. This ultimately delayed the release, as the label submitted the album for further mixing and marketing. "Sony is a big battleship of a company," said lead singer Jon Foreman. "It takes a long time to turn it around. It's like parallel parking a Buick." It was finally released February 25, 2003, as The Beautiful Letdown.

 Music and lyrics 
The album features a departure from the lo-fi indie rock sound of their previous three albums. This shift to a more layered, heavier rock sound with occasional electronica influences can be attributed to the addition of long-time touring member Jerome Fontamillas as a full-time band member. Contributing more to the recording process by filling in with his added instrumental versatility prompted Foreman to note, "I feel like Jerome is a great team player. I mean the same thing where live he just kind of fills in, is the same thing on the album. He's just a wonderful guy to have around." The sound was also influenced by the fact that "these were songs that we'd played live countless times, songs that we'd lived with". "This was also the most prepared we'd ever been for a record," bassist Tim Foreman has commented. The album brings together an eclectic sound as it gathers inspiration from the previous ten years of contemporary rock. The song "This Is Your Life" features a more subtle pop jam, while the up-beat, light-hearted "Gone" brings the album to an entirely different place musically, exemplifying the band's musical versatility.

Lyrically, the songs on the album speak of hope in spite of an imperfect world. "The Beautiful Letdown is about real life: the good, the bad, and the ugly," said Jon Foreman. "It's an honest attempt to reflect on the great and terrible aspects of being human, the tension of existence." "Meant to Live" expresses this in the lyric, "We were meant to live for so much more/have we lost ourselves?/We want more than this world's got to offer/We want more than the wars of our fathers." While the band's Christian beliefs are clearly communicated through the album's message, bassist Tim Foreman notes: "We're Christian by faith, not by genre." Inspired by their role model U2, the band seeks to merge the appeal of rock with deep and spiritual thoughts.

The first few promotional copies of the album were printed with the song "Monday Comes Around" on it. When the wide release version went to print, Foreman removed the song, as he felt it didn't match the tone of the album. The song can now be found on the 2004 re-release of "The Beautiful Letdown" on the accompanying DVD, the b-side of the Meant to Live vinyl single, in copies of the Japan release of Nothing Is Sound, and in the 2007 iTunes Deluxe re-release of The Beautiful Letdown.

 Artwork 
The guitar that appears on the album cover at the bottom of the pool is actually a guitar that Foreman bought at a pawn shop in North Dakota. The original intention was "to light it on fire, but the place wouldn't let us light things on fire, so we were going to break it in half." But after playing it a few times, Foreman became too attached to it, thus leaving it intact at the bottom of the pool. The photo used on the cover was taken at a "sketchy hotel" in North Los Angeles. Several variations of the cover exist. The original 2003 pressings of the record featured black lettering on the artwork, while the 2004 re-issues featured larger white letters and/or a sticker with the title font superimposed onto an image of a drum set.

 Reception 
The release of their fourth studio album was met with resounding success, selling over 2.6 million copies and becoming certified double platinum. Despite the overwhelming success of the now-mainstream Christian band, some criticized The Beautiful Letdown claiming that it lacked originality and saying that it was too similar to other alternative Christian rock such as Jars of Clay and Creed.

Track listing

 2004 CD/DVD release 
In 2004, "The Beautiful Letdown" was re-released in two different forms: A standard CD-only reissue featuring a slightly tweaked audio mix, as well as new artwork, and a CD/DVD package.

The CD/DVD edition featured a DVD that included a few bonus-features, including the entire album in 5.1 Surround Sound.

It also featured a Making of "Dare You to Move" video, as well as Version 1 of the music video itself, an acoustic impromptu performance of "On Fire", and two previously unreleased bonus tracks, "Monday Comes Around" and "Meant to Live (Live)".

In 2005, the album was released, this time as a DualDisc. The audio side remained the same as the 2004 re-issue, and the DVD side featured all of the same features, but also included the second version music video of "Dare You to Move."

 Personnel Switchfoot Jon Foreman – guitar, vocals
 Tim Foreman – bass, backing vocals
 Chad Butler – drums, percussion
 Jerome Fontamillas – guitar, keyboards, backing vocalsAdditional musicians Ameena Maria Khawaja – cello
 Stephan Hovsepian – violin
 John Fields – keyboard, FX, percussion, tasty bits

Recorded at Sage and Sound, Mansfield Lodge, and Jon Foreman's house.

Mixed at Larrabee North 3.Additional personnel'''
 John Fields – production, recording, mixing, additional production and remix 
 Switchfoot – production, additional production and remix 
 Charlie Peacock – production 
 Chris Lord-Alge – mixing 
 Tom Lord-Alge – mixing 
 Jack Joseph Puig – mixing 
 Tim Divine – A&R
 Erin Familia – assistant
 Ted Reiger – assistant
 Dorian Crozier – computers
 Mike Buzbee – computers
 Aaron Redfield – drum tech
 Jon Leshay – management
 Mark Guynn – touring
 Aaron Pinkus – touring
 Mary Maurer – art direction
 Matthew Welch – photography
 Kevo Sassouni – design

Charts

Weekly charts

Year-end charts

Decade-end charts

Certifications

 In TV and film 
Many of Switchfoot's songs have been used in various TV shows and movies.
 The WB's series Smallville used "This Is Your Life".
 The 2007 film The Ultimate Gift incorporated "On Fire" into one of its scenes.
 "Dare You to Move" was featured in three episodes of One Tree Hill and the soundtrack to the film A Walk to Remember, and was also used in promotional spots for The O.C.
 In 2004, "Meant to Live" received an alternate music video promoting the Sam Raimi-directed film Spider-Man 2''.

References

External links 
 The Beautiful Letdown lyrics
 Song Stories from Jon Foreman

Music videos 
 
 Dare You To Move
 Dare You To Move Version 2

2003 albums
Albums produced by Charlie Peacock
Albums produced by John Fields (record producer)
Albums produced by Switchfoot
Columbia Records albums
Switchfoot albums